Juan Weiss (died 29 October 2001) was a Cuban tennis player.

Born in Sancti Spíritus, Weiss competed for Cuba in five Davis Cup ties between 1949 and 1955. He also represented his country at the 1950 Central American and Caribbean Games in Guatemala City and was a silver medalist partnering Lorenzo Nodarse in the doubles event.

Weiss, who reached the third round of the 1948 U.S. National Championships, emigrated to the United States with his family in the early 1960s to escape communism.

See also
List of Cuba Davis Cup team representatives

References

External links
 
 
 

Year of birth missing
2001 deaths
Cuban male tennis players
People from Sancti Spíritus
Competitors at the 1950 Central American and Caribbean Games
Central American and Caribbean Games medalists in tennis
Central American and Caribbean Games silver medalists for Cuba
Cuban emigrants to the United States
21st-century Cuban people